Julia Crawford Ivers (October 3, 1869 – May 8, 1930) was an American motion picture pioneer.

Biography
Born in Boonville, Missouri, in 1869, her family arrived a year later in Los Angeles. Her father was a dentist. Her mother died in 1876, when Julia was seven years old. Julia's sister, Grace, died at age 14. Ivers watched the film industry come into existence and establish itself in southern California. She participated in the new industry as writer, producer and director.

She and her husband, Franklin S. Van Trees (aka Frank Van Trees 1866 – 1914), a famed "society" architect best known for his mansions in the Pacific Heights area of San Francisco, had a son, James Van Trees (1890 – 1973), who became a popular cinematographer for Paramount Pictures and Warner Bros. and shot some of his mother's films. Ivers later worked with director William Desmond Taylor and was reportedly a part of his inner circle before his murder. Her extremely wealthy second husband was Oliver Ivers (who died in 1902, two years after their marriage).

Death
Julia Crawford Ivers died in Los Angeles in 1930, aged 60, from stomach cancer.

Selected filmography
The Heart of Paula (1916) (director, writer, story)
The American Beauty (1916) (lost film)
The Intrigue (1916) (writer)
The Call of the Cumberlands (1916) (writer)
David Garrick (1916)
A Son of Erin (1916) (director, writer) (print: Library of Congress)
The World Apart (1917)
 Sauce for the Goose (1918)
Widow by Proxy (1919)
Huckleberry Finn (1920) (writer)
Nurse Marjorie (1920) (writer)
Jenny Be Good (1920) (writer)
The Furnace (1920)
Sacred and Profane Love (1921) (writer)
Wealth (1921)
Beyond (1921) (story, scenario)
The White Flower (1923) (director, writer)
Married Flirts (1924) (writer)

References

External links

Profile, findagrave.com

1869 births
1930 deaths
American women film directors
American women screenwriters
Silent film directors
Film directors from Los Angeles
American women film producers
Film producers from California
Deaths from stomach cancer
Deaths from cancer in California
Women film pioneers
Screenwriters from California
20th-century American women writers
20th-century American screenwriters